Alban Jasper Conant (September 24, 1821 – February 3, 1915) was a painter best known for painting the first portrait of Abraham Lincoln.

Personal life

Conant was born on September 23, 1821 in Chelsea, Vermont, to Caleb and Sally Conant. His father was a sign and house painter. He graduated from Gouverneur Wesleyan Seminary in 1844 and later took a degree from Madison University in Hamilton, New York. He married Sarah Mahala Howes in New York in 1845. The couple moved to St. Louis, Missouri in 1857 where Conant helped found an art gallery. The Western Academy of Art was opened in St. Louis in 1860 as a fine art gallery. After bearing several children, Sarah died in 1867. Conant married a second time to Brianna C. Bryan in 1869. He had one additional child with his second wife before she died in 1875.

Career

In addition to painting Abraham Lincoln, he also created portraits of some of Lincoln's cabinet officers; Attorney General Edward Bates and Secretary of War Edwin Stanton. Notable paintings of his include When the Attack was Begun and Burial of DeSoto. Well-known portraits of his include portraits of Henry Ward Beecher, James McCosh, John Gilbert, General William Tecumseh Sherman and Major Robert Anderson at Fort Sumter.

His portraits are owned and displayed by a number of American institutions. They can be found at the Smithsonian American Art Museum, United States Department of Justice, the Missouri Historical Society, Colgate University, Princeton University, Amherst College, Dickinson College, the State Supreme Court of New York, the New-York Historical Society, and the Abraham Lincoln Presidential Library and Museum.

Conant also wrote or co-wrote several books. He wrote Foot-prints of vanished races in the Mississippi valley in 1879 and My acquaintance with Abraham Lincoln in 1893.
Conant wrote A portrait painter's reminiscences of Lincoln in 1909 and eleven chapters of The Commonwealth of Missouri: A Centennial Record in 1877. The chapters were about the archaeology of Missouri.

He served as a curator at University of Missouri in Columbia, Missouri, for eight years. He founded the School of Mines and Metallurgy and then supervised the school for three years.
He lived in New York City from about 1885 until his death in 1915.

Works
"Switzler's Illustrated History of Missouri, 1541-1877" (1877)
"A Commonwealth of Missouri; A Centennial Record" (1877)
"Foot-prints of vanished races in the Mississippi valley : being an account of some of the monuments and relics of prehistoric races scattered over its surface, with suggestions as to their origin and uses" (1879)
"A Portrait Painter's Reminiscences of Lincoln" (1893)
"Portrait of William Carr Lane"
"The First Gun at Fort Sumter"

References

1821 births
1915 deaths
Burials at Bellefontaine Cemetery
Painters from Vermont
19th-century American painters
20th-century American painters
American portrait painters
American male painters
People from Chelsea, Vermont
University of Missouri curators
Artists from St. Louis
Painters from Missouri
19th-century American male artists
20th-century American male artists